The MU90 Impact is a Franco-Italian advanced lightweight anti-submarine torpedo of the 3rd generation developed for the French and Italian navies, as well as for export. It is designed to compete with and outperform the United States-built Mark 54 in the anti-submarine role, and has also been developed in a special MU90 Hard Kill version for torpedo anti-torpedo defence.  The MU90 is built by EuroTorp, a consortium of French and Italian companies.

History
The MU90 was the result of separate projects in France and Italy from the 1980s. In France, a project under the direction of Thomson Sintra created the "Murène" in 1989, while in Italy Whitehead started work on an A244 replacement known as the A290. In 1990 the first attempts to merge the two efforts started, a process that was completed in 1993 with the formation of EuroTorp.

The French intended to use the new torpedo on their frigates, Atlantique 2 aircraft, Lynx helicopters and NFH90 helicopters.  They originally wanted 1000 units, but the end of the Cold War saw their requirement cut to 600 in 1991, 450 in 2000 and finally 300 torpedoes in 2008. The project has cost France €1,150m in 2012 prices at a unit cost of €1.6m, or €3.8m including development costs. 25 torpedoes per year were to be delivered to France until 2014.

Design
The MU90 is designed to be capable of discriminating between actual and perceived threat, including a bottomed stationary mini-submarine, known versions of anechoic coatings, and various decoys. Powered by an electric pump-jet, it can be run at "silent" speeds to avoid giving its location away to the submarine, or "dash" at speeds over 29 knots. It uses a shaped charge warhead that can penetrate any known submarine hull, in particular Soviet double hull designs, while remaining just as deadly in shallow waters where conventional warheads are less effective.

In 1986 France and Italy began a collaboration to develop an anti-submarine missile based on the Italian Otomat missile. France dropped out of the programme but Italy has fitted the MBDA MILAS missile to its s and FREMM anti-submarine frigates.

Exports

After deciding that its Mark 46 torpedoes were inadequate, Australia set up the JP2070 project in 1998 to buy torpedoes for its s, s, AP-3C Orion aircraft, S-70B-2 Seahawk helicopters and planned SH-2G(A) Super Seasprite helicopters. The Seasprites were cancelled and the Orions and Seahawks were removed from the MU90 programme on budget grounds; their replacements, the P-8 Poseidon and MH-60R Seahawk will use the US Mark 54 torpedo. The A$639m project to buy a classified number of MU90 has been heavily criticised by the Australian National Audit Office on the grounds of cost, insufficient test firings which failed to reveal defects in the torpedo, and the lack of commonality with the Navy's air-launched torpedoes. The MU90 reached IOC in November 2012.

Operators

 
 
 
 
 
 
 
 
  Greece will obtain MU-90 Torpedo for her new FDI HN.

See also
 APR-3E torpedo - Russian equivalent
 A244-S - Italian equivalent
 Mark 54 Lightweight Torpedo - US Navy's equivalent
 Sting Ray (torpedo) - British equivalent
 TAL Shyena - Indian equivalent
 Yu-7 torpedo - Chinese equivalent
 K745 Chung Sang Eo - South Korean equivalent
 Type 97 light weight torpedo (G-RX4) - Japanese equivalent

References

Post–Cold War weapons of Germany
Naval weapons of France
Naval weapons of Italy
Aerial torpedoes
Military equipment introduced in the 2000s